Fairfield railway station is located on the Beenleigh line in Queensland, Australia. It serves the Brisbane suburb of Fairfield.

To the west of the station lies the NSW North Coast dual gauge line primarily used by Gold Coast, NSW TrainLink XPT and freight services.

History
The first Fairfield railway station opened in 1885 and was adjacent to modern day Fairfield Road. Following the 1893 Brisbane flood, the Fairfield Deviation resulted in the railway between Dutton Park and Yeronga being rebuilt to the east with the current station opening in 1895.

In September 1930, the standard gauge New South Wales North Coast line opened to the west of the station. In 1995, as part of the construction of the Gold Coast line, the standard gauge line was converted to dual gauge.

From 28 March 2022 until 8 January 2023, Fairfield Station was closed for major upgrade works as part of the Cross River Rail project. Works will include a new 3rd platform and new overpass including lifts.  The heritage-listed waiting shelter on Platform 1 will be removed temporarily and reinstated later in the project.

The station reopened on Monday 9th January 2023 however construction works are continuing until late 2023.

Services
Fairfield station is served by all stops Beenleigh line services from Beenleigh, Kuraby and Coopers Plains to Bowen Hills and Ferny Grove.

Until June 2011, Fairfield was also served by services to Corinda via the Yeerongpilly-Corinda line.

Services by platform

References

External links

Fairfield station Queensland's Railways on the Internet
[ Fairfield station] TransLink travel information

Railway stations in Brisbane
Railway stations in Australia opened in 1885